The members of the 36th General Assembly of Newfoundland were elected in the Newfoundland general election held in March 1972. The general assembly sat from April 19, 1972, to August 25, 1975.

The Progressive Conservative Party led by Frank Moores formed the government.

James Russell served as speaker.

There were three sessions of the 36th General Assembly:

Ewart John Arlington Harnum served as lieutenant governor of Newfoundland until 1974. Gordon Arnaud Winter succeeded Harnum as lieutenant-governor.

Members of the Assembly 
The following members were elected to the assembly in 1972:

Notes:

By-elections 
By-elections were held to replace members for various reasons:

Notes:

References 

Terms of the General Assembly of Newfoundland and Labrador